Pseudominolia gradata is a species of sea snail, a marine gastropod mollusk in the family Trochidae, the top snails.

Description
The size of the shell varies between 3 mm and 8 mm. The turbinate shell is widely and profoundly perforated. It  is white with radially large, brown spots. The apex is acute. The sutures are narrowly channeled. The six whorls are angulated, with the upper whorl is concave to flat. The spire is adorned with oblique striae. and two keels (with narrow lirae between them). The body whorlis biangulate and contains irregular 3 to 4 carinae. The convex base is finely striated and laminated and provided with six rounded lirae. The aperture is slightly oblique and is subquadrate. The peristome is sharp.

Distribution
This species occurs in the Red Sea and in the Eastern Indian Ocean and off Sri Lanka

References

External links
 To World Register of Marine Species

gradata
Gastropods described in 1895